Fisher and Ludlow was a British car body manufacturing company based in Castle Bromwich, Birmingham.

Operation
A high volume operation, Fisher and Ludlow built finished and trimmed car bodies which were then trucked to the "manufacturer"'s works to be fitted with all the mechanicals.

Ownership
It was acquired by the British Motor Corporation (BMC) in 1953. After the merger of BMC and Pressed Steel Company (PSC) in 1966, and the formation of the British Leyland Motor Corporation (BLMC) in 1968, the Fisher & Ludlow business was merged with the PSC business to form Pressed Steel Fisher under BLMC.

External links
 1950 metal finishing, Morris Minors
 1950 paint preparation, Standard Vanguards
 1950 final assembly, Bendix washing machines
 Grace's Guide - Fisher & Ludlow A short history of F & L. It contains a link to a 1950 publication detailing the first 100 years.
 Austin Memories
 Fisher & Ludlow Camping & Caravan Club 
The Fisher and Ludlow Camping and Caravan Club, which used to form part of the social club is still in existence and part of the British Leyland Camping and Caravan Association.

References

Coachbuilders of the United Kingdom